Neojapyx is a genus of diplurans in the family Japygidae.

Species
 Neojapyx centralis (Silvestri, 1902)
 Neojapyx guianae Silvestri, 1933
 Neojapyx insulanus Silvestri, 1948
 Neojapyx ortonedae Silvestri, 1948
 Neojapyx tropicalis Ewing & Fox, 1942

References

Diplura